= Yarazarvi =

- Village
- Country: India
- State: Karnataka
- District: Belgaum

Government
  - Body: Sarpanch

Population (2011)
  - Total: 914 families or 4,928
- Time zone: UTC+5:30 (IST)

Yarazarvi is a village in Belgaum district in the southern state of Karnataka, India.

As of the 2011 census of India, the population of the village was 4,928 people, living in 914 households. Of this population, 2,518 of the people were enumerated in the census as male, and 2,410 of the people were enumerated as female. A total of 700 children in the town were aged 0–6, with 354 male, the remaining 346 female. The languages spoken in the village were Kannada, Marathi, and English. The literacy rate of the town was 50.14%, the male literacy was 62.71%, and the female literacy was 36.97%. A total of 2,463 people in the town were part of the workforce, with 1,459 of the workers being male, 1,004 being female.
